Rob Mullett (born 31 July 1987) is a British steeplechase runner. He competed at the 2016 Summer Olympics in the 3000 metres steeplechase event, but failed to reach the final.

Mullett grew up in Sussex and competed for Lewes Athletics club. He completed his undergraduate studies at St Mary's University, Twickenham and after graduating from there, earned a scholarship at Butler University in Indianapolis, Indiana, where he earned a Master's in Education, Teaching and Leadership. At Butler, Mullett became the first sub-four-minute miler in school history and holds the school record in the mile.

Mullett now lives in Atlanta, Georgia, where he trains with Atlanta Track Club Elite and competes in road races for prize money.

References

External links
 
 Atlanta Track Club Profile

1987 births
Living people
Sportspeople from Manchester
British male steeplechase runners
English male steeplechase runners
Olympic male steeplechase runners
Olympic athletes of Great Britain
Athletes (track and field) at the 2016 Summer Olympics
World Athletics Championships athletes for Great Britain
British Athletics Championships winners